The nickname Al is often short for Alfred, Albert, Alphonse, Alphons, Allen, Allan, Alan, Alyson, Alysson, Allyson, Alistair, Alister, Alex, Alexander, Alvin, Alyssa, Alisha, Aldrin, Alden, Aldo, Aldwin, Ali Alwin or Aloysius. People named Al include:

Art, entertainment, and media
 Al Bowlly (1898–1941), South African-British singer and guitarist
 Al Caiola (1920–2016), American guitarist, composer, arranger
 Al Cartwright (1917–2015), American sportswriter
 Al Casey (rock guitarist) (1936–2006), American guitarist
 Al Columbia (born 1970), American cartoonist
 Al Green (born 1946), American R&B musician
 Al Israel, (1935–2011), American actor
 Al Jarreau (1940–2017), American singer
 Al Jean (born 1961), American screenwriter and television producer
 Al Johnson (musician) (1948–2013), American singer, arranger, producer
 Al Jolson (1886–1950), American singer and actor
 Al Kooper (born 1944 as Alan Peter Kuperschmidt), American songwriter and musician
 Al or Alec Lazo, Cuban-American dancer
 Al Murray (born 1968), English stand-up comedian
 Al Pacino (born 1940), actor and director
 Al Roker (born 1954), American television broadcaster
 Al Sapienza (born 1962), actor
 Al Sharpton (born 1954), American civil rights activist, Baptist minister, talk show host and politician
 Al Stewart (born 1945), English singer-songwriter and folk-rock musician
 "Weird Al" Yankovic (born 1959), American parody singer

Sports

Baseball

 Al Levine (born 1968), American major league baseball pitcher
 Al Rosen (1924–2015), American major league baseball All Star and MVPa
 Al Silvera (1935–2002), American major league baseball player
 Al Kaline (1934–2020), American major league baseball player

Boxing

 Al McCoy (boxer) (Alexander Rudolph; 1894–1966), American world champion middleweight boxer
 Al Singer ("The Bronx Beauty"; 1909–61), American world champion lightweight boxer
 Al Haymon (born 1955), American boxing promoter

Gridiron football
 Al Bedner (1898–1988), American football player
 Al Bloomingdale (born 1953), American player of Canadian football
 Al Darby (born 1954), American football player
 Al Davis (1929–2011), American football coach and executive
 Al Hoptowit (1915–1981), American football player
 Al Latimer (born 1957), American football player
 Al Romano (born 1953), American football player
 Al Shook (1899–1984), American football player
 Al Valdes, Canadian football player
 Al Witcher (born 1936), American football player

Other sports
 Al Green (basketball) (born 1953), American-Australian basketball player
 Al Green (wrestler) (1955–2013), American professional wrestler
 Al Horford (born 1986), Dominican basketball player
 Al Unser Sr. (1939-2021), American racing driver
 Al Unser Jr. (born 1962), American racing driver

Politics
 Al Capone (1899–1947), prominent Chicago gangster from the 1920s
 Al Franken (born 1951), former US senator from Minnesota
 Al Gore (born 1948), environmentalist, former US Senator and former Vice President of the United States
 Al Smith (1873–1944), former Governor of New York

Fictional characters
 Al Bundy, a character in the television series Married... with Children
Al Powell, a police Sergeant from Die Hard
Al Da Flaga, a fictional character in the anime Gundam SEED
Al Dillon, a character in the 1987 film Predator

English masculine given names
Hypocorisms